The 1972–73 NBA season was the Lakers' 25th season in the NBA and 13th season in Los Angeles.

During the previous season (1971-1972), the Lakers had posted the longest winning streak in NBA history with 33 straight victories. In the 1972 NBA Finals, the Lakers had defeated New York Knicks in five games to win their sixth NBA Championship. However, even though the Lakers managed to make to the NBA Finals for a second consecutive time, they proved unable to repeat as champions. The Knicks defeated them in five games.

Following the season, Wilt Chamberlain retired.

Offseason

Draft picks

Roster

Regular season
The defending champion Lakers returned intact, albeit another year older. They staged another season long battle for best record in the Western Conference with the Milwaukee Bucks.  Both teams ended up with 60–22 records and they split their regular season matchups, winning three games apiece. At the time, the NBA had no tiebreaking formula beyond head-to-head record. In a special league meeting, they attempted to schedule a tiebreaking game between the two teams. However, the players' union intervened and demanded the players be paid an extra 1/82 share of the salaries; the owners objected so ultimately the tie was broken by a coin flip, which was won by Milwaukee.

Season standings

z – clinched division title
y – clinched division title
x – clinched playoff spot

Record vs. opponents

Game log

Playoffs

|- align="center" bgcolor="#ccffcc"
| 1
| March 30
| Chicago
| W 107–104 (OT)
| Gail Goodrich (28)
| Wilt Chamberlain (20)
| Jerry West (9)
| The Forum16,341
| 1–0
|- align="center" bgcolor="#ccffcc"
| 2
| April 1
| Chicago
| W 108–93
| Gail Goodrich (33)
| Wilt Chamberlain (21)
| Jerry West (19)
| The Forum17,368
| 2–0
|- align="center" bgcolor="#ffcccc"
| 3
| April 6
| @ Chicago
| L 86–96
| Jim McMillian (24)
| Wilt Chamberlain (18)
| Jerry West (13)
| Chicago Stadium14,606
| 2–1
|- align="center" bgcolor="#ffcccc"
| 4
| April 8
| @ Chicago
| L 94–98
| Jim McMillian (25)
| Wilt Chamberlain (30)
| Goodrich, West (5)
| Chicago Stadium14,181
| 2–2
|- align="center" bgcolor="#ccffcc"
| 5
| April 10
| Chicago
| W 123–102
| Jerry West (36)
| Wilt Chamberlain (29)
| Jerry West (11)
| The Forum17,505
| 3–2
|- align="center" bgcolor="#ffcccc"
| 6
| April 13
| @ Chicago
| L 93–101
| Jerry West (19)
| Wilt Chamberlain (26)
| Jerry West (5)
| Chicago Stadium18,096
| 3–3
|- align="center" bgcolor="#ccffcc"
| 7
| April 15
| Chicago
| W 95–92
| Jerry West (27)
| Wilt Chamberlain (28)
| Jerry West (7)
| The Forum17,505
| 4–3
|-

|- align="center" bgcolor="#ccffcc"
| 1
| April 17
| Golden State
| W 101–99
| Jim McMillian (37)
| Wilt Chamberlain (25)
| Jerry West (8)
| The Forum17,505
| 1–0
|- align="center" bgcolor="#ccffcc"
| 2
| April 19
| Golden State
| W 104–93
| Jerry West (36)
| Wilt Chamberlain (20)
| Jerry West (6)
| The Forum17,505
| 2–0
|- align="center" bgcolor="#ccffcc"
| 3
| April 21
| @ Golden State
| W 126–70
| Jim McMillian (28)
| Wilt Chamberlain (25)
| Jerry West (11)
| Oakland–Alameda County Coliseum Arena13,183
| 3–0
|- align="center" bgcolor="#ffcccc"
| 4
| April 23
| @ Golden State
| L 109–117
| Jerry West (32)
| Wilt Chamberlain (16)
| Gail Goodrich (7)
| Oakland–Alameda County Coliseum Arena8,000
| 3–1
|- align="center" bgcolor="#ccffcc"
| 5
| April 25
| Golden State
| W 128–118
| Gail Goodrich (44)
| Wilt Chamberlain (22)
| Jerry West (9)
| The Forum17,505
| 4–1
|-

|- align="center" bgcolor="#ccffcc"
| 1
| May 1
| New York
| W 115–112
| Gail Goodrich (30)
| Wilt Chamberlain (20)
| Wilt Chamberlain (6)
| The Forum17,505
| 1–0
|- align="center" bgcolor="#ffcccc"
| 2
| May 3
| New York
| L 95–99
| Jerry West (32)
| Wilt Chamberlain (20)
| Goodrich, West (5)
| The Forum17,505
| 1–1
|- align="center" bgcolor="#ffcccc"
| 3
| May 6
| @ New York
| L 83–87
| Jim McMillian (22)
| Wilt Chamberlain (13)
| Wilt Chamberlain (5)
| Madison Square Garden19,694
| 1–2
|- align="center" bgcolor="#ffcccc"
| 4
| May 8
| @ New York
| L 98–103
| Goodrich, West (23)
| Wilt Chamberlain (19)
| Bill Bridges (7)
| Madison Square Garden19,694
| 1–3
|- align="center" bgcolor="#ffcccc"
| 5
| May 10
| New York
| L 93–102
| Gail Goodrich (28)
| Wilt Chamberlain (21)
| Jerry West (4)
| The Forum17,505
| 1–4
|-

Awards and records
 Jerry West, All-NBA First Team
 Jerry West, NBA All-Defensive First Team
 Wilt Chamberlain, NBA All-Defensive First Team
 Jerry West, NBA All-Star Game
 Wilt Chamberlain, NBA All-Star Game
 Gail Goodrich, NBA All-Star Game
 Jim Price, NBA All-Rookie Team 1st Team

References

Los Angeles
Los Angeles Lakers seasons
Western Conference (NBA) championship seasons
Los Angle
Los Angle